Atlanta Air Route Traffic Control Center (ZTL) (radio communications, "Atlanta Center") is one of 22 Air Route Traffic Control Centers operated by the United States Federal Aviation Administration. It is located at 299 Woolsey Rd, Hampton, Georgia, United States.

The primary responsibility of Atlanta Center is sequencing and separation of over-flights, arrivals, and departures in order to provide safe, orderly, and expeditious flow of aircraft.

Atlanta Center is the busiest air traffic control facility in the world. In 2019, Atlanta Center handled 3,022,513 aircraft operations.  Atlanta Center covers approximately 129,000 square miles of the Southern United States, including parts of Georgia, Alabama, South Carolina, North Carolina, Tennessee, Kentucky, West Virginia, Virginia, and touches parts of Florida, and Mississippi.

Atlanta Center borders five other Air Route Traffic Control Centers, including Houston Air Route Traffic Control Center, Jacksonville Air Route Traffic Control Center, Washington Air Route Traffic Control Center, Indianapolis Air Route Traffic Control Center, and Memphis Air Route Traffic Control Center. ZTL overlies or abuts many approach control facilities (including Atlanta, Charlotte, Greensboro, Knoxville, Chattanooga, and Birmingham, Alabama approaches).

References

External links
 Atlanta Center Weather Service Unit (CWSU) (NWS/FAA)

Air traffic control
Air traffic control centers
Air traffic control in the United States
Aviation in Georgia (U.S. state)